Marlo Javier Delgado Suarez (born May 6, 1993) is an Ecuadorian professional boxer. As an amateur he competed at the 2012 Summer Olympics in the Men's middleweight, but was defeated in the first round.

Professional boxing record

Notes

References

External links
 
 
 
 
 

1993 births
Living people
Ecuadorian male boxers
Middleweight boxers
Olympic boxers of Ecuador
Boxers at the 2012 Summer Olympics
Boxers at the 2016 Summer Olympics
People from Ibarra, Ecuador
21st-century Ecuadorian people